The following low-power television stations broadcast on digital or analog channel 27 in the United States:

 K27AE-D in Victorville, etc., California
 K27AI-D in Ninilchik, etc., Alaska
 K27CD-D in Boulder, Montana
 K27CL-D in Coos Bay/North Bend, Oregon
 K27CS-D in Montpelier, Idaho
 K27DA-D in Big Sandy Valley, Arizona
 K27DO-D in Bend, etc., Oregon
 K27DX-D in McCall, Idaho
 K27EJ-D in Colorado City, Arizona
 K27FI-D in Frost, Minnesota
 K27GB-D in Beryl/Modena/New Castle, Utah
 K27GC-D in Heber/Midway, Utah
 K27GD-D in Park City, Utah
 K27GL-D in Hobbs, New Mexico
 K27GM-D in Preston, Idaho
 K27HJ-D in Pierre, South Dakota
 K27HM-D in Quanah, Texas
 K27HP-D in Alamogordo, New Mexico
 K27HR-D in Manti & Ephraim, Utah
 K27IG-D in Cortez, etc., Colorado
 K27IH-D in Holyoke, Colorado
 K27IM-D in Billings, Montana
 K27IS-D in Emery, Utah
 K27JK-D in Glendale, Nevada
 K27JO-D in Strong City, Oklahoma
 K27JP-D in Little Rock, Arkansas
 K27JQ-D in Wolf Point, Montana
 K27JT-D in Fillmore, etc., Utah
 K27JV-D in Kanab, Utah
 K27JW-D in Joplin, Montana
 K27JY-D in London Springs, Oregon
 K27JZ-D in Round Mountain, Nevada
 K27KA-D in Parlin, Colorado
 K27KC-D in Ferron, Utah
 K27KE-D in Huntington, Utah
 K27KH-D in Orderville, Utah
 K27KN-D in Alexandria, Minnesota
 K27KP-D in Driggs, Idaho
 K27KR-D in Fishlake Resort, Utah
 K27KS-D in Globe/Miami, Arizona
 K27KV-D in Evanston, Wyoming
 K27KW-D in Gold Hill, etc., Oregon
 K27KX-D in Las Animas, Colorado
 K27LD-D in Salix, Iowa
 K27LK-D in Gateview, Colorado
 K27LL-D in Big Falls, Minnesota
 K27LO-D in Emigrant, Montana
 K27LT-D in Baker, Montana
 K27MF-D in Orovada, Nevada
 K27MM-D in Tendoy/Leadore, Idaho
 K27MQ-D in St. George, Utah
 K27MT-D in Romeo, Colorado
 K27MV-D in Durant, Oklahoma
 K27MW-D in Soda Springs, Idaho
 K27MX-D in Baker Valley, Oregon
 K27MY-D in Altus, Oklahoma
 K27NB-D in Baton Rouge, Louisiana
 K27NC-D in Coeur D'Alene, Idaho
 K27ND-D in Aztec, New Mexico
 K27NF-D in Jackson, Minnesota
 K27NG-D in Fountain Green, Utah
 K27NH-D in Morgan, etc., Utah
 K27NI-D in Neligh, Nebraska
 K27NK-D in Parowan, Enoch, etc., Utah
 K27NL-D in Clovis, New Mexico
 K27NM-D in Delta, etc., Utah
 K27NN-D in Eureka, Nevada
 K27NO-D in Vernal, Utah
 K27NP-D in Duchesne, Utah
 K27NQ-D in Helper, Utah
 K27NR-D in Topock, Arizona
 K27NT-D in Golden Valley, Arizona
 K27NU-D in Green River, Utah
 K27NV-D in Scofield, Utah
 K27NW-D in East Price, Utah
 K27NX-D in Ridgecrest, California
 K27NY-D in Clear Creek, Utah
 K27NZ-D in Longview, Washington
 K27OD-D in Verdi/Mogul, Nevada
 K27OF-D in Crested Butte, Colorado
 K27OG-D in Clarendon, Texas
 K27OH-D in Lund & Preston, Nevada
 K27OI-D in Mina/Luning, Nevada
 K27OJ-D in El Paso, Texas
 K27OM-D in Valmy, Nevada
 K27ON-D in Lucerne Valley, California
 K27OO-D in Ellensburg, Washington
 K27OP-D in Oro Valley/Tucson, Arizona
 K27OR-D in Klagetoh, Arizona
 K27OU-D in Lovell, Wyoming
 K27OV-D in Woody Creek, Colorado
 K27OW-D in Rochester, Minnesota
 K27OY-D in Memphis, Tennessee
 K27PC-D in Yuma, Arizona
 K27PE-D in Gustine, California
 K30GC-D in Rural Beaver, etc., Utah
 K40MV-D in Susanville, etc., California
 KAOB-LD in Beaumont, Texas
 KAVC-LD in Denver, Colorado
 KBAX-LD in Twin Falls, Idaho
 KBGU-LD in St. Louis, Missouri
 KBKI-LD in Boise, Idaho
 KBPX-LD in Houston, Texas
 KBTV-CD in Sacramento, California
 KCOR-CD in San Antonio, Texas
 KCWS-LD in Sioux Falls, South Dakota
 KDJB-LD in Hondo, Texas
 KDKJ-LD in Tyler, Texas
 KEBK-LD in Bakersfield, California
 KEDD-LD in Los Angeles, California
 KETF-CD in Laredo, Texas
 KFDY-LD in Lincoln, Nebraska
 KFVT-LD in Wichita, Kansas
 KGJT-CD in Grand Junction, Colorado
 KHGI-CD in North Platte, Nebraska
 KLUF-LD in Lufkin, Texas
 KNWS-LD in Brownsville, Texas
 KNXG-LD in College Station, Texas
 KOHA-LD in Omaha, Nebraska
 KPCD-LD in San Fernando, California
 KPOM-CD in Ontario, California
 KQHO-LD in Houston, Texas, uses KBPX-LD's spectrum
 KRZG-CD in McAllen, Texas
 KSCD-LD in Hemet, California
 KSFV-CD in Los Angeles, California, uses KPOM-CD's spectrum
 KSKC-CD in Pablo/Ronan, Montana
 KSLM-LD in Dallas, Oregon
 KTBV-LD in Los Angeles, California
 KTVW-CD in Flagstaff/Doney Park, Arizona
 KUCO-LD in Chico, California
 KUNU-LD in Victoria, Texas
 KVER-CD in Indio, California
 KWBH-LD in Rapid City, South Dakota
 KWYF-LD in Casper, Wyoming
 KXNV-LD in Incline Village, Nevada
 KYAM-LD in Hereford, Texas
 KYMB-LD in Monterey, California
 KYPO-LD in Tacna, Arizona
 W18CJ in Quincy, Illinois
 W27AU-D in Wausau, Wisconsin
 W27DG-D in Millersburg, Ohio
 W27DK-D in Columbus, Georgia
 W27DP-D in New Bern, North Carolina
 W27DQ-D in Elmhurst, Michigan
 W27DU-D in Traverse City, Michigan
 W27DZ-D in Mayaguez, Puerto Rico
 W27EC-D in Belvidere, New Jersey
 W27EE-D in Martinsburg, West Virginia
 W27EF-D in Charleston, West Virginia
 W27EH-D in Hattiesburg, Mississippi
 W27EI-D in Moorefield, West Virginia
 W27EJ-D in Sterling, Illinois
 W27EK-D in Boone, North Carolina
 W27EL-D in Champaign, Illinois
 W27EO-D in Panama City, Florida
 W27EP-D in Destin, Florida
 W27EQ-D in Peoria, Illinois
 W27ET-D in Maple Valley, Michigan
 W48CL in Grand Rapids, Michigan
 WBSE-LD in Charleston, South Carolina
 WBUN-LD in Birmingham, Alabama
 WFMZ-TV (DRT) in Boyertown, Pennsylvania
 WGEI-LD in Enterprise, Alabama
 WGTB-CD in Charlotte, North Carolina
 WGZT-LD in Key West, Florida
 WHJC-LP in Williamson, West Virginia
 WHVL-LD in State College, etc., Pennsylvania
 WILC-CD in Sugar Grove, Illinois
 WJGN-CD in Chesapeake, Virginia
 WLZE-LD in Fort Myers, Florida
 WMJQ-CD in Syracuse, New York
 WNAL-LD in Scottsboro, Alabama
 WOCD-LD in Dunnellon, Florida
 WOCV-CD in Cleveland, Ohio
 WPNM-LD in Liepsic, Ohio
 WPSJ-CD in Hammonton, New Jersey
 WSOT-LD in Marion, Indiana
 WTBT-LD in Tampa, Florida
 WWAX-LD in Westmoreland, New Hampshire
 WWRJ-LD in Jacksonville, Florida
 WXSG-LD in Springfield, Illinois
 WYJH-LD in White Lake, New York
 WYME-CD in Gainesville, Florida

The following low-power stations, which are no longer licensed, formerly broadcast on digital or analog channel 27:
 K27BH in Lake Shastina, California
 K27BZ-D in Wellington, Texas
 K27CB in Fraser, etc., Colorado
 K27DS in Yucca Valley, California
 K27DV in Crowley Lake-Long Va, California
 K27DY in Carlin, Nevada
 K27EC-D in Lake Havasu City, Arizona
 K27EE-D in Ukiah, California
 K27FC in Paragould, Arkansas
 K27GE in Wanship, Utah
 K27GR in Paris, Texas
 K27HU in Price, Utah
 K27HV in Scofield, Utah
 K27JJ-D in Forbes/Jasper Cty, Texas
 K27KM in Wendover, Utah
 K27MG-D in Columbia, Missouri
 KCWK-LP in Yakima, Washington
 KEXT-CD in Modesto, California
 KFRE-CA in Tulare, California
 KHGI-LD in O'Neil, Nebraska
 KIDQ-LP in Lewiston, Idaho
 KNYS-LD in Natchitoches, Louisiana
 KPDN-LP in Monahans, Texas
 KULG-LD in Springfield, Missouri
 KWCE-LP in Alexandria, Louisiana
 KZSW-LP in Hemet, California
 W27BL in Berlin, New Hampshire
 W27DH-D in Evansville, Indiana
 W27DV-D in Bluffton–Hilton Head, Georgia
 WBKH-LD in Port Charlotte, Florida
 WFHD-LP in Ann Arbor, Michigan
 WPCP-CD in New Castle, Pennsylvania
 WUDI-LD in Myrtle Beach, South Carolina

References

27 low-power